Melting Stones, a fantasy novel by young adult author Tamora Pierce, was released by Full Cast Audio as an audiobook original in October 2007, and was released in print form by Scholastic in the summer of 2008.

The book takes place after the events of Street Magic and the 2013 novel Battle Magic, and around the same time as the 2005 novel The Will of the Empress. It follows characters Evumeimei Dingzai (nicknamed Evvy) and Rosethorn, former travel companions of Briar Moss, in their journey to the Battle Islands to investigate the death of the local plantlife and an impending volcano eruption.

It was Pierce's suggestion that she write an original novel for Full Cast Audio, and when she first heard young actress Grace Kelly (actual name) read the part of Evvy during rehearsals for Street Magic. The author decided to recast what she had already written from third to first person so that Kelly could actually narrate the recording.

Bruce Coville, publisher of Full Cast Audio, served as editor for the text, and Pierce herself directed the recording.

Plot overview
Melting Stones follows Evvy, the young stone mage introduced in Street Magic, who accompanies her guardian Rosethorn on a mission to Starns Island to study a mysterious plant die-off. With her magic—and the help of Luvo, the heart of a mountain—the girl discovers a threat far greater than anyone could have imagined. Preventing disaster may cost Evvy her life.

Evvy sulks about being aboard a ship to the Battle Islands; she is only there because she used her stone magic to damage some rich boys studying at Winding Circle for bothering her friends, and the alternative punishment was house arrest at Discipline Cottage. Her power is suppressed by being separated from stone by fathoms of water, repelled by the power of the sea. She is accompanied by Luvo, the animated heart of a mountain that started to accompany Evvy when Rosethorn, Briar, and Evvy traveled in Gyongxe. Evvy first feels the earth move when she is on the ship. She rejoices at the feel of the earth being close to her, however on land this causes violent tremors. Protective of Rosethorn because they survived the war together, Evvy warns the traveling party about feeling the earth move more than once, often preceded or echoed by Luvo. The third member of their party is Dedicate Myrrhtide, often referred to by Evvy as Dedicate Fusspot, an older, fully accredited water mage. He warns the other two that the reception on the island may not be warm, despite the fact that the island called for help. He also notes that the Battle Islands were only recently purged of the pirate menace. The dedicates have been asked to examine Starns Island because trees are dying with no obvious cause. After the boat docks, they meet two men who guide them to the village that called for their help.  One of them is named Oswin, who is known throughout the island for being able to fix things, because he observes what mages do besides magic. Oswin has taken in children who were left behind when the island was cleared of pirates, because he attempted to place them in other homes but was not entirely successful.

Rosethorn and Myrrhtide both examine the island cautiously with Evvy in tow. She is strongly compelled to go underground in her magic form by power deep underneath her feet. Upon arriving there, she meets two fire spirits, who she names Flare and Carnelian. They drag her around an underground chamber where there resides thousands of fire spirits, draining her magic along the way. She barely escapes with her life, and when she comes back into her real body, she is very weak. She tells the villagers upon her return that the spirits want to break out of the chamber, and Flare and Carnelian will show them the way eventually. Rosethorn and Myrrhtide realize that these spirits precede a volcano eruption; the death of the life on the island is consistent with that conclusion, given the poison that Evvy describes as smelling like rotten eggs. The villagers, however, mistrust Evvy because they think that her story is fabricated to get her out of being beaten by Rosethorn. When Evvy convinces the village mages to show the village council the truth of her story, the village finally believes her. She wakes up two days later having slept so long from exhaustion, while evacuations are progressing. Evvy wants to leave, because the Winding Circle group have already confirmed the impending volcano. However, Rosethorn insists that they stay to help and Evvy is sent to Oswin's house. Charged with giving a little girl a bath, she frightens the girl into taking the bath after finally convincing Flare and Carnelian to break themselves into little pieces and put themselves into crystal, where they will be trapped for a long time. Because Evvy recognizes that if they break out, they will be so powerful that they may destroy the island, Luvo changes the maze to become like a Möbius strip, with no end to give the humans more time to escape. As evacuation of the island proceeds, Oswin suggests a plan that could save the entire island. She then offers the plan to Rosethorn without success.

References

External links
Tamora Pierce's official website
Full Cast Audio

Emelanese books
2007 American novels
2007 fantasy novels